Et øye på hver finger (Keep Your Eyes Peeled) is a Norwegian comedy film from 1961 directed by Nils-Reinhardt Christensen. He also wrote the script for the film based on Ingeborg Storm's novel of the same name. The film stars Georg Løkkeberg, Trulte Heide Steen, and Harald Heide Steen.

Plot
A new radar antenna codenamed R.A. 19 X is to be installed in a small garrison town on the Norwegian coast. The antenna is guarded by a group of soldiers. Three of them signed up for this task so they can play dance music at the Victoria Hotel when they are on leave. They are attracted to the colonel's daughter Maja, who is employed in the hotel's kitchen, but who has learned to handle joking men in uniform. Some hotel guests seem to be keeping a close eye on everything. A certain John Miller is in contact with the suspicious Bredesen, who has connections with people that show up in places where they have no business being. Dramatic, joking, and romantic scenes are played out on the rocks close to the military area.

Cast

Georg Løkkeberg as John Miller
Trulte Heide Steen as Maja Allnes
Harald Heide Steen as Colonel Allnes
Tor Stokke as Arne Allnes, a lieutenant
Sissel Juul as Minnie, a waitress
Henki Kolstad as Director Anatol
Carsten Winger as Bredesen
Alf Malland as the dark gentleman in a black car
Frithjof Fearnley as the man with a beard
Per Rønningen as the man in a bathrobe
Sverre Holm as the man in the armchair
Anja Breien as the woman in bed
Benyoucef Jacquesson as the voice on the radio telephone
Sven Libaek as Helge, a member of the group The Windjammers
Harald Tusberg as Hamlet, a member of the group The Windjammers
Tim Gaunt as Hugo, a member of the group The Windjammers
Nøste Schwab as Mrs. Allnes
Anders Ljono as the principal
Tore Foss as the general
Torbjørn Lein as Gustav
Kjetil Bang-Hansen as chair of the graduating class festivities
Geir Sørnes Hansen as the boy with a slingshot
Turid Balke as Fiffa
Wenche Medbøe as Kari
Aud Schønemann as the troublesome woman
Britta Lech-Hanssen as Mrs. Neslund
Randi Brænne as Madame
Tom Remlov as Dag Allnes
Erna Schøyen as Mrs. Matheus
Pelle Bjørgan as the sergeant
Henny Skjønberg as the hostess at Strandveien 104
Erik Lassen as Mr. Svenson

References

External links
 
 Et øye på hver finger at the National Library of Norway
 Et øye på hver finger at Filmfront

1961 comedy films
Norwegian comedy films
1960s Norwegian-language films
Norwegian black-and-white films
Films directed by Nils Reinhardt Christensen